Narnaul railway station is a railway station in Mahendragarh district, Haryana. Its code is NNL. It serves Narnaul town. The station consists of two platforms. Passenger, Express, and Superfast trains halt here.

Trains

The following trains halt at Narnaul railway station in both directions:

 Chetak Express
 Bandra Terminus–Delhi Sarai Rohilla Express
 Chandigarh–Bandra Terminus Superfast Express
 Ajmer–Delhi Sarai Rohilla Jan Shatabdi Express

References

Railway stations in Mahendragarh district
Jaipur railway division
Railway stations in Haryana